8 A.M. may refer to:
A time on the 12-hour clock
8AM, a 2017 album by Teengirl Fantasy
"8AM" (song), a 2009 single by Coldrain

See also
8 Air Maintenance Squadron (8 AMS), a Royal Canadian Air Force unit

Date and time disambiguation pages